Gurdon P. Randall (February 18, 1821– September 20, 18841884) was an architect in Chicago, Illinois. Early in his career, he studied in Boston, Massachusetts, in the office of Asher Benjamin. He moved to Chicago when he was 30, and practiced there for 34 years, focusing on large institutional architecture. He designed a number of notable buildings, including several that survive and are listed on the National Register of Historic Places.

Biography
Gurdon P. Randall was born in Braintree, Vermont on February 18, 1821. His siblings included Francis V. Randall, an attorney and Union Army officer during the American Civil War. He attended public school and assisted his father in lumbering and carpentry. Randall married Louisa Caroline Drew on January 31, 1842. When he was twenty-two, Randall moved to Boston, Massachusetts to study architecture with Asher Benjamin and G. W. Gray. In 1845 he returned to Vermont, establishing an architect's office at Northfield, later relocating to the larger town of Rutland. Randall specialized in railroad buildings, designing many of the structures on the Vermont Central and Rutland & Burlington lines. In Rutland Randall worked with his brother J. J. R. Randall, who succeeded to the practice when he relocated, in 1850, to Syracuse, New York. He practiced there for another six years.

In 1856, he moved west to Chicago, Illinois. There, he focused on designing public buildings such as county courthouses and churches. Major commissions in the Chicago area included University Hall at Northwestern University, Union Park Congregational Church, Eighth Presbyterian Church, and Plymouth Church. He also designed plans for the Theological Seminary of the Northwest and the original University of Saint Mary's of the Lake. Many of his Chicago works were destroyed in the Great Chicago Fire in 1871. Outside of the Chicago area, Randall also designed some of the first buildings at The State Normal University in Bloomington, Illinois; the Minnesota State Normal School in Winona, Minnesota; and the Whitewater Normal School in Whitewater, Wisconsin. He died on September 20, 1884.

Architectural works

References

1821 births
1884 deaths
Architects from Vermont
People from Braintree, Vermont
19th-century American architects